Thylochromus is a genus of dirt-colored seed bugs in the family Rhyparochromidae. There is one described species in Thylochromus, T. nitidulus.

References

Drymini
Articles created by Qbugbot